Hawaii was a sovereign constitutional monarchy until this government was overthrown in January 1893, but many of its laws were already modeled after those of the United States, including (for example) registering dogs and issuing metal tags for them since the 1870s. The Republic of Hawaii which replaced the previous government was annexed as a Territory by the United States in August 1898, and the first automobiles to be shipped to the Hawaiian Islands arrived in 1899. Each of Hawaii's four counties registered vehicles completely autonomously starting with the City & County of Honolulu in 1906, and license plates were homemade / owner-provided. The first government-issued plates were used by both Honolulu and the County of Hawaii in 1915. Maui County first issued plates in 1919, while Kauai County retained homemade plates through 1921; this was the last jurisdiction in the United States to do so. All license plates were standardized throughout the Territory of Hawaii for the first time in 1922. Despite its status as a territory, Hawaii's vehicle registration laws and license plates were the same as the rest of the United States. Hawaii was admitted to the Union as the 50th state in August 1959.

Passenger baseplates

1922 to 1952
No slogans were used on passenger plates during the period covered by this subsection.

1953 to present
The first Hawaii license plate that complied with these standards was a modification of the 1953 plate, introduced in 1956.

Since 1969, all Hawaii passenger plates have featured a round mounting hole at the top right and horizontal slots in the other three corners. This irregularity is to accommodate the yearly registration sticker in the upper right corner of the rear plate.

Non-passenger types

1981 base

1991 base

Optional types

1991 base

Unique base

References

External links
Hawaii license plates 1969-present

Hawaii
Transportation in Hawaii
Hawaii transportation-related lists